Yakov M. Rabkin (born 29 September 1945) is a professor emeritus of history at the Université de Montréal, author and public intellectual. His published works include studies of relations between science and technology, research on cultural aspects of science, including studies of Jews in the scientific profession, Science Between the Superpowers (Priority Press), a study of programs for the exchange of U.S and Soviet Union scientists, as well as works on the fate of Soviet science and scientists after the dismemberment of the USSR and, more generally, on science and political freedoms. As a result of his graduate seminar on demodernization and an international conference he organized in Nice in 2016, he co-edited Demodernization: a Future in the Past, a multidisciplinary volume on reverses of modernity as a global phenomenon at the turn of the 21st century.

Professor Rabkin has also contributed to the fields of Jewish and Israel studies. His book A Threat from Within: A Century of Jewish Opposition to Zionism was nominated for best French to English translation for "an important and timely work" at the 2006 Governor General's Awards. It has also been listed as one of the three best books of the year by Japan's leading daily Asahi Shimbun in 2010. This book is currently available in fourteen languages. He later published What Is Modern Israel? which has also appeared in French, Japanese and Russian. It examines the Protestant origins of the Zionist project; the adoption of that project in the late 19th century by secular Jews from Central and Eastern Europe, imbued with the ethnic nationalism of the time; the stern resistance Zionism faced from Jews around the world, not least in the Holy Land; and the ongoing Jewish opposition to Zionism from different perspectives, both religious and secular.

Rabkin is a frequent contributor to printed and electronic media on international relations, Russia and the former USSR as well as contemporary Israel. He has argued for freedom of discussion, against political uses of history and shown skepticism with respect to a two-state solution for the Israel/Palestine conflict. He has expressed support for a bi-national state. He has done consulting work on science and higher education for national and international organizations, including UNESCO, NATO, OECD and the World Bank.

References

External links
 Interview at Jerusalem Post 2006
 Q & A at Haaretz 2006
 Interview at Huffington Post 2016
 Russia on the International Checkerboard see pages 25-35 April 2017 
 Interview October 4, 2017 What is Modern Israel?

Academic staff of the Université de Montréal
Historians from Quebec
Jewish historians
Cold War historians
Historians of Jews and Judaism
Living people
Historians of science
Jewish Canadian writers
1945 births